The United States Department of Veterans Affairs (VA) maintains many cemeteries specifically devoted to veterans. Most have various rules regarding what must take place in order to be interred there.

Procedure
The VA only permits graphics on government-furnished headstones or markers that are approved emblems of belief, the Civil War Union Shield (including those who served in the U.S. military through the Spanish–American War), the Civil War Confederate Southern Cross of Honor, and the Medal of Honor insignia. Arlington National Cemetery has similar restrictions on headstones, though it is maintained by US Department of the Army.

The religious symbols are rendered as simple inscriptions without sculptural relief or coloring other than black. The emblem of belief is an optional feature.

Generally the VA adds a new symbol a few months after receiving a petition from a faith group. However, the Wiccan symbol was only added in 2007 to settle a lawsuit filed on behalf of several families by Americans United for the Separation of Church and State in November 2006. A separate parallel lawsuit was filed on behalf of two Wiccan churches and three families by the American Civil Liberties Union in September 2006, which was resolved by the same settlement.

The first interfaith headstone, which includes a Wiccan pentacle for Jan Deanna O'Rourke and a Presbyterian Cross for her husband, was installed at Arlington National Cemetery on May 1, 2007, and dedicated on July 4, 2007.

Headstone and marker symbols
The following emblems and emblem numbers are publicized as available for government headstones and markers as of August 2022. A process is in place to consider approving additional religious or belief system emblems requested by the families of individuals eligible for these headstones and markers.

Each emblem is given its official USVA name and designation, with added additional links for related symbolism (*) and for related movements (†). Explanatory footnotes are provided where symbols' meanings are not immediately apparent.

Notes

See also
 Pennant (church)
 Religious symbolism
 Religious symbolism in the United States military
 United States National Cemetery System
 List of military tombstone abbreviations

References

External links
 
 USVA National Cemetery Administration: Available Emblems of Belief for Placement on Government Headstones and Markers
 USVA Form 40-1330: Claim for Standard Government Headstone or Marker
 Arlington National Cemetery – Emblems

Emblems for headstones and markers
Religious symbols
Military symbols
Religion and society in the United States
Burial monuments and structures

Lists of symbols